This is a list of biographical films.

Before 1950

1950s

1960s

1970s

1980s

1990s

2000s

2010s

2020s

See also

 List of composers depicted on film

Notes

References

 
Lists of films by genre